The Charlestown Five Cent Savings Bank is a historic building in Charlestown, Boston, in the U.S. state of Massachusetts. It received landmark status in 1981 by the Boston Landmarks Commission.

References

External links

 
 Charlestown Five Cent Savings Bank at Waymarking

Bank buildings in Boston
Charlestown, Boston